Sasquatch! Music Festival was an annual music festival held at The Gorge Amphitheatre in George, Washington, United States. It took place on Memorial Day weekend, running for three to four days.

In 2018, it was announced that the festival was canceled indefinitely and would not return in 2019.

About the festival

Sasquatch! typically featured a range of musical genres, with the emphasis being on indie rock bands and singer-songwriters, but also including alternative rock, hip hop, EDM, and comedy acts.  As of 2012 the festival featured five stages: Sasquatch! Main Stage, Bigfoot Stage, Banana Shack (a tent that featured primarily comedy acts and electronic music- now known as El Chupacabra), Yeti Stage, and Uranus Stage (the smallest of stages, that generally changed names every year, but was not present from 2017 onward).

Most attendees of the festival camped in designated campsite fields nearby, as the venue is relatively remote and there are no large urban areas nearby.

Sasquatch! was voted as one of the "Top 10 Summer Music Festivals in the US" by ConcertBoom.

History
The Sasquatch! Music Festival was founded in 2002 by Pacific Northwest-based concert promoter Adam Zacks, then at House of Blues. Prior to the inception of the festival, Zacks booked and managed shows at the Roseland Theater in Portland, Oregon. After moving to Seattle to be closer to friends and family, Zacks began considering the creation of a music festival in the Pacific Northwest. In an interview with Seattle Weekly in September 2007, Zacks described the birth of Sasquatch!:

Sasquatch was an idea born on a hunch that there was untapped demand for a certain kind of festival that catered to the eclectic tastes of music enthusiasts. It started in 2002, which was shortly after a number of the touring festivals (Lollapalooza, Lilith, Horde) had petered out and the beginning of the wave of regional festivals that started with Coachella and now is a dominant force on the music landscape, with Bonnaroo, Austin City Limits, etc.

In 2014, Adam Zacks decided to expand the festival to two weekends due to the high demand for tickets in 2013. On March 21, 2014, the Independence Day Weekend of Sasquatch was cancelled. Jeff Trisler, President of Live Nation, released the following statement upon the announcement: "The Sasquatch! community has spoken. They continue to support the traditional Memorial Day Weekend event with great enthusiasm," Jeff Trisler, president of Live Nation Seattle, said in a statement. "Unfortunately, the second weekend was not embraced. We felt it was better to cancel the new event now and give everyone time to make alternative plans for the Fourth of July weekend. Going forward, Sasquatch! Music Festival will be at the Gorge Amphitheatre on the weekend the fans want: Memorial Day Weekend only."

On June 28, 2018, Zacks officially announced that Sasquatch! Music Festival would cease operation indefinitely and would not be returning in 2019.

2018

Lineup

Friday, May 25

Bon Iver
David Byrne
Tyler, the Creator
Vince Staples
Tash Sultana
Thundercat
Wolf Parade
Snakehips
Margo Price
Hippo Campus
Nao
Julien Baker
Whitney
Pond
Thunderpussy
Hurray for the Riff Raff
Lemaitre
Gang of Youths
Jeff Rosenstock
Son Little
Benjamin Clementine
The Garden
The Suffers
Taco
Giants in the Trees
Aquilo
CCFX

Saturday, May 26

Modest Mouse
Spoon
Grizzly Bear
Explosions in the Sky
TV on the Radio
Shakey Graves
Japandroids
Jai Wolf
Petit Biscuit
Lizzo
Pedro the Lion
PUP
Pickwick
Tyler Childers
Girlpool
Curtis Harding
Rostam
Jlin
Algiers
Sango
White Reaper
Escort
Magic Sword
Wilderado
Polyrhythmics
Mimicking Birds
Bread & Butter

Sunday, May 27

The National
Ray Lamontagne
Anderson Paak & The Free Nationals
Neko Case
Slowdive
Tune-Yards
What So Not
Perfume Genius
Noname
Tokimonsta
Tank and the Bangas
Jacob Banks
Big Thief
Japanese Breakfast
Sandy Alex G
Typhoon
Dhani Harrison
Soccer Mommy
Barclay Crenshaw
Too Many Zooz
Oliver
Phoebe Bridgers
Alex Lahey
Charly Bliss
Gifted Gab (replaced Chastity Belt (band))
The Weather Station
Choir! Choir! Choir!

2017

Lineup

Friday, May 26

Frank Ocean(cancelled, replaced by LCD Soundsystem)
The Head and the Heart
Bonobo
Kaytranada
Sleigh Bells
Charles Bradley & His Extraordinaires
Foxygen
The Strumbellas
Thee Oh Sees
Rainbow Kitten Surprise
Sales
The Hotelier
Big Freedia
Manatee Commune
Corey Harper
Mondo Cozmo
Flint Eastwood
Los Colognes
Porter Ray
Gazebos
Sasheer Zamata
Sal Vulcano
Yogi Paliwal

Saturday, May 27

Twenty One Pilots
MGMT
Mac Miller (cancelled, replaced by Sir Mix-a-Lot)
Bleachers
Big Gigantic
Vulfpeck
Bomba Estéreo
Aesop Rock
American Football
Jagwar Ma
Kungs
The Radio Dept.
Benjamin Clementine
Arkells
IHF
Kaiydo (cancelled, replaced by Sam Lachow)
Klangstof
Reuben & The Dark
Courtney Marie Andrews
Katie Kate
Donormaal
Fred Armisen
Nate Bargatze
Alice Wetterlund

Sunday, May 28

Chance the Rapper
The Shins
Phantogram
Rüfüs Du Sol
Catfish and the Bottlemen (cancelled)
Kiiara
Bob Moses
Car Seat Headrest
Mount Kimbie
Fakear
Moses Sumney
White Lung
Cigarettes After Sex
July Talk
Boogie
Joey Purp
Hoops
Kyle Craft
Saint Mesa
Beth Stelling
Sam Morril
Emmett Montgomery

2016

Lineup

Friday, May 27

Disclosure
Grace Love & The True Loves
Oh Wonder
Andra Day
A$AP Rocky
Telekinesis (band)
Unknown Mortal Orchestra
Vince Staples
Yeasayer
Chet Faker
Lion Babe
Gordi
Bayonne
LANY
Wolf Alice
Marcus Marr
Alina Baraz
Todd Terje

Saturday, May 28

Major Lazer
Brothers from Another
Raury
Matt Corby
Nathaniel Rateliff & The Night Sweats
Lord Huron
Digable Planets
M83
Hibou
Noah Gunderson
La Luz
Ty Segall & The Muggers
M. Ward
Blind Pilot
Vic Mensa
Tycho
Tangerine
The Dip
John Mark Nelson
Ryan Caraveo
Tamaryn
Protomartyr
Hop Along
Shannon & The Clams
Preoccupations
Moshe Kasher
Natasha Leggero
The Lucas Bros
Kevin Garrett
Beat Connection
Marian Hill
Rudimental

Sunday, May 29

The Cure
Tacocat
Houndmouth
Saint Motel (cancelled due to severe wind)
Frightened Rabbit (cancelled due to severe wind)
Allen Stone
Leon Bridges
Alabama Shakes
Deep Sea Diver
Autolux
The Twilight Sad
Savages
Yo La Tengo
Mac Demarco
Purity Ring
Big Grams + Big Boi & Phantogram
Cosmos
Ruler
Fauna Shade
Wimps
Summer Cannibals
Conner Youngblood
Kaleo
Bully
Speedy Ortiz
Dave Hill
Lauren Lapkus
Scharpling & Wurster
Briana Marela
Baio
Shamir
Baauer

Monday, May 30

Florence & The Machine
Thunderpussy
Casey Veggies
The Internet
Børns
X Ambassadors
Grimes
Sufjan Stevens
Dave B
Son Little
Julia Holter
Thao & The Get Down Stay Down
Titus Andronicus
Baroness
Kurt Vile & The Violators
Jamie xx
Mindie Lind
Iska Dhaff
Childbirth
Sir the Baptist
Joseph
Soak
Oddisee
King Gizzard & the Lizard Wizard
Chelsea Wolfe
Tim Heidecker
Mark Normand
Todd Barry
Wet
Ibeyi
Four Tet
Caribou

2015

Lineup

Friday, May 22

Sleater-Kinney
Of Monsters and Men
Flume
The New Pornographers
Little Dragon
Gogol Bordello
Jungle
Action Bronson
Angel Olsen
Kaytranada
AlunaGeorge
Goldlink
Bishop Nehru
Mother Mother
Cardiknox
Ought
Blank Range
Thunderpussy
Ayron Jones and The Way
Sisters
Slow Bird
Unlikely Friends
Brooks Wheelan

Saturday, May 23

Modest Mouse
The Decemberists
Spoon
Chromeo
The War on Drugs
Odesza
Father John Misty
Twenty One Pilots
Kiesza
Real Estate
Glass Animals
Dilated Peoples
Sylvan Esso
The Budos Band
Benjamin Booker
Perfume Genius
Milo Greene
Woods
King Tuff
Black Pistol Fire
Will Butler
Merchandise
Ryley Walker
Hunter Hunted
Diarrhea Planet
Bear on Fire
The Young Evils
Vox Mod
Murder Vibes
Acapulco Lips
Leslie Jones
Cameron Esposito
Yogi Paliwal

Sunday, May 24

Robert Plant & The Sensational Space Shifters
Lana Del Rey
St. Vincent
James Blake
SBTRKT
Jose Gonzalez
Jenny Lewis
Milky Chance
Madeon
Royal Blood
Shovels & Rope
Cashmere Cat
Temples
Rustie
Shakey Graves
St. Paul & The Broken Bones
The Knocks
Strand of Oaks
Twin Peaks
Said the Whale
Kae Tempest
Quilt
Hiss Golden Messenger
Ex Hex
My Goodness
The Maldives
Kinski
Black Whales
Cataldo
Alialujah Choir
Smokey Brights
Shaprece
Aparna Nancherla
Emmet Montgomery

Monday, May 25

Kendrick Lamar
Ryan Adams
Tame Impala
Hot Chip
Schoolboy Q
The Glitch Mob
Run the Jewels
MØ
Future Islands
Ab-Soul
Sohn
Sharon Van Etten
Courtney Barnett
Slow Magic
Hanni El Khatib
Sam Lachow
Dan Mangan + Blacksmith
Thee Satisfaction
PHOX
San Fermin
Alvvays
The Districts
Broncho
Lizzo
Natalie Prass
Grynch
Manatee Commune
DJAO
Helms Alee
S (Jenn Ghetto)
Porter Ray
Otieno Terry
Doug Benson
Nick Thune
Sara Schaefer

2014

Lineup

Friday, May 23

Outkast
Foster the People
Die Antwoord
Foals
Mogwai
The Naked & Famous
Phantogram
Cage the Elephant
Rudimental
Phosphorescent
De La Soul
Chance the Rapper
Kongos
Yelle
Classixx
Liars
Crystal Fighters
Mary Lambert
Damien Jurado
The Stepkids
Tourist
Houndmouth
Foy Vance
Shakey Graves
Hozier
Rhett Miller
White Sea
The Physics
Modern Kin
PRINCESS
Eugene Mirman
Kyle Dunnigan
Raz Simone
Sam Lachow
Gifted Gab
Night Beats
Kithkin
Iska Dhaaf

Saturday, May 24

The National
M.I.A.
Cut Copy
Neko Case
Tyler, the Creator
Violent Femmes
Panda Bear
Boys Noize
Tokimonsta
City and Colour
First Aid Kit
Washed Out
Chet Faker
Augustines
Band of Skulls
Sol
Ryan Hemsworth
The Dodos
Half Moon Run
Willy Mason
Austra
Cloud Control
Deafheaven
The Growlers
Jonathan Wilson
Rathborne
Radiation City
The Bright Light Social Hour
Deap Vally
Nick Swardson
Bridget Everett
Eric Andre
Sandrider
Chastity Belt
The Grizzled Mighty
Dude York
Hobosexual
New Lungs

Sunday, May 25

Queens of the Stone Age
Kid Cudi
Haim
Major Lazer
Elbow
Portugal. The Man
Rodriguez
Cold War Kids
Tune-Yards
Bob Mould
Gesaffelstein
Tycho
Black Joe Lewis
Big Freedia
Banks
Brody Dalle
Sir Sly
John Grant
Parquet Courts
Waxahatchee
PAPA
Syd Arthur
The Lonely Forest
Lucius
Little Green Cars
Big Scary
Pink Mountaintops
La Luz
Tacocat
Demetri Martin
Hannibal Buress
Kate Berlant
Polyrhythmics
Fly Moon Royalty
The Flavr Blue
Shelby Earl
Pillar Point
Pollens

2013

Lineup

Friday, May 24

Macklemore & Ryan Lewis
Vampire Weekend
Arctic Monkeys
Built to Spill
Father John Misty
Schoolboy Q & Ab-Soul
Youth Lagoon
Matthew Dear
Japandroids
Red Fang
Baauer
Jherek Bischoff
Sea Wolf
Four Color Zack
Reignwolf
ZZ Ward
Erik Blood
Nacho Picasso
Brothers From Another
Shelton Harris
Telekinesis

Saturday, May 25

Sigur Rós
The xx
Empire of the Sun
Bloc Party
Andrew Bird
Tame Impala
Black Rebel Motorcycle Club
Devendra Banhart
Divine Fits
Totally Enormous Extinct Dinosaurs
Porcelain Raft
JJ Grey & Mofro
Holy Ghost!
Preservation Hall Jazz Band
Atlas Genius
Fang Island
Bombino
Surfer Blood
Laidback Luke
John Talabot
Nancy & Beth
Akron/Family
Yppah feat. Anomie Belle
Caveman
Indians
Suuns
Rose Windows
Bear Mountain
Nick Offerman
Kyle Kinane
Joe Mande
KnowMads
Tilson XOXO
RA Scion

Sunday, May 26

Mumford & Sons
Elvis Costello & The Imposters
Edward Sharpe & The Magnetic Zeros
Primus 3D
Grimes
Dropkick Murphys
The Tallest Man on Earth
The Presets
Earl Sweatshirt
Killer Mike
El-P
Shout Out Louds
DIIV
Torche
Youngblood Hawke
Shad
Shovels & Rope
Radical Face
Wild Belle
Hundred Waters
Wake Owl
Sean Nelson
Capital Cities
Deep Sea Diver
Azari & III
Baths
Lusine
Brett Gelman
Brody Stevens
Jon Daly
OC Notes: "Golden Gods"
Kingdom Crumbs
Xperience XP

Monday, May 27

The Postal Service
The Lumineers
Cake
Imagine Dragons
Rusko
Alt-J
Menomena
Steve Aoki
Azealia Banks
Disclosure
Toro y Moi
Danny Brown
Ariel Pink's Haunted Graffiti
Beachwood Sparks
P.O.S
The Barr Brothers
Dirty Projectors
Death Grips
Elliott Brood
Odesza
Ryan Bingham
Michael Kiwanuka
Brown Bird
Willy Moon
Twin Shadow
Peace
CHVRCHES
Luke Sital-Singh
The Wild Feathers
Mike Birbiglia
Jenny Slate
James Adomian
Grieves
Theoretics
Nissim

2012

Lineup

Friday, May 25

Pretty Lights
Girl Talk
Santigold
Of Monsters and Men
Allen Stone
Explosions in the Sky
Mark Lanegan Band
Poliça
Yellow Ostrich
Beats Antique
Little People
James McCartney
honeyhoney
Sean Wheeler and Zander Schloss
The Physics
Metal Chocolates
Scribes

Saturday, May 26

Jack White
The Shins
Metric
Childish Gambino
Jamey Johnson
The Civil Wars
Blitzen Trapper
Charles Bradley and His Extraordinaires
Pickwick
The Roots
St. Vincent
Tune-Yards
The Helio Sequence
Dum Dum Girls
Kurt Vile and the Violators
Alabama Shakes
Electric Guest
STRFKR
Reptar
Wolfgang Gartner
Nobody Beats the Drum
Purity Ring
AraabMuzik
Com Truise
Portlandia
Rob Delaney
Pete Holmes
Cœur de Pirate
Lord Huron
Unknown Mortal Orchestra
Dry the River
THEESatisfaction
Craft Spells
Said the Whale
Black Whales
Sol
Grynch
Fatal Lucciauno

Sunday, May 27

Bon Iver
Beirut
The Head and the Heart
M. Ward
Chiddy Bang
Blind Pilot
Trampled by Turtles
Dale Earnhardt Jr. Jr.
Hey Marseilles
Feed Me (with Teeth!)
Little Dragon
The Walkmen
Wild Flag
The War on Drugs
Here We Go Magic
Hospitality
Graffiti6
The Staves
James Murphy
Apparat
Star Slinger
Tycho
Beat Connection
Todd Barry
Beardyman
Howard Kremer
Zola Jesus
We Are Augustines
Active Child
Hey Rosetta!
Gardens and Villa
Howlin Rain
Reignwolf
Greylag
Fly Moon Royalty
SPAC3MAN
Dyme Def

Monday, May 28

Beck
Tenacious D
Silversun Pickups
Feist
The Joy Formidable
Clap Your Hands Say Yeah
Gary Clark Jr.
Grouplove
The Sheepdogs
Spiritualized
Deer Tick
The Cave Singers
Shabazz Palaces
fun.
Cloud Cult
Damien Jurado
Ben Howard
Walk the Moon
The Sights
Nero
SBTRKT
LA Riots
Felix Cartal
Awesome Tapes From Africa
Nick Kroll
John Mulaney
Chelsea Peretti
Ted Leo and the Pharmacists
John Reilly and Friends (feat. Becky Stark and Tom Brosseau)
Shearwater
Vintage Trouble
Cass McCombs Band
Sallie Ford and the Sound Outside
Poor Moon
Gold Leaves
Fresh Espresso
Don't Talk to the Cops!
Katie Kate

2011
The lineup for the 2011 Sasquatch! Music Festival was announced on February 6, 2011.

Lineup

Friday, May 27

Foo Fighters
Death From Above 1979
Bob Mould
Against Me!
Rival Schools
DJ Anjali & The Incredible Kid
Biffy Clyro
The Bronx

Saturday, May 28

Death Cab for Cutie
Bright Eyes
Iron & Wine
Bassnectar
Robyn
Pink Martini
Wolf Parade
Local Natives
Matt & Kim
Trailer Park Boys
Sleigh Bells
The Thermals
Jenny & Johnny
The Head & the Heart
k-os
The Glitch Mob
The Radio Dept.
The Antlers
Sharon Van Etten
Aloe Blacc
Seattle Rock Orchestra
Matt McCarthy
DJ Anjali & The Incredible Kid
The Secret Sisters
J. Mascis
Wye Oak
Tig Notaro
Alberta Cross
Washed Out
Dan Mangan
The Globes
Rebecca Gates and the Consortium
Pepper Rabbit

Sunday, May 29

Modest Mouse
The Flaming Lips
Flogging Molly
Cold War Kids
Ratatat
Yeasayer
Beach House
MSTRKRFT
Flying Lotus
Tokyo Police Club
Fitz and the Tantrums
Archers of Loaf
City and Colour
Reggie Watts
Gayngs
Tim Minchin
The Drums
Sam Roberts Band
Smith Westerns
Villagers
DJ Anjali & The Incredible Kid
Das Racist
Wheedle's Groove
S. Carey
Gold Panda
Mad Rad
Basia Bulat
Cotton Jones
Other Lives
Talkdemonic
The Moondoggies
Hari Kondabolu

Monday, May 30

Wilco
The Decemberists
Rodrigo y Gabriela
Old 97's
Major Lazer
Chromeo
Guided by Voices
Sharon Jones & The Dap-Kings
Deerhunter
Wavves
Skrillex
!!!
Best Coast
Surfer Blood
Macklemore & Ryan Lewis
Bonobo
Young the Giant
Stornoway
Black Mountain
Givers
DJ Anjali & The Incredible Kid
Noah & the Whale
Twin Shadow
Foster the People
White Denim
Axis of Awesome
Jaill
White Arrows
Head Like A Kite
The Young Evils
The Scott Aukerman & Paul F. Tompkins Show

2010
The lineup for the 2010 Sasquatch! Music Festival was announced on February 15, 2010.  Headliners for the event included My Morning Jacket, Massive Attack, and Ween.  The event took place on Memorial Day weekend, May 29–31, 2010.

Lineup

Saturday, May 29

My Morning Jacket 
Vampire Weekend
The National
Broken Social Scene
OK Go
Brad
Minus the Bear
Brother Ali
Shabazz Palaces
Public Enemy
The Hold Steady
Miike Snow
Edward Sharpe and the Magnetic Zeros
Portugal. The Man
Mumford & Sons
Why?
The Lonely Forest
Patrick Watson
The Middle East
Nurses
Fool's Gold
Morning Teleportation
Garfunkel and Oates
DJ Z-Trip
Dâm-Funk
The Very Best
Deadmau5
The Posies

Sunday, May 30

Massive Attack
Pavement
LCD Soundsystem
Tegan and Sara
Kid Cudi
They Might Be Giants
The Long Winters
Midlake
Caribou
Nada Surf
Dirty Projectors
Girls
The xx
City and Colour
Cymbals Eat Guitars
The Tallest Man on Earth
Local Natives
Fruit Bats
Vetiver
Freelance Whales
Avi Buffalo
Tune-Yards
Jets Overhead
Simian Mobile Disco
A-Trak
YACHT
Booka Shade

Monday, May 31

Ween
MGMT
Band of Horses
She & Him
Passion Pit
Drive-By Truckers
The Temper Trap
Mayer Hawthorne & The County
Jaguar Love
The New Pornographers
Camera Obscura
The Mountain Goats
Dr. Dog
Quasi
The Low Anthem
Tame Impala
No Age
Japandroids
Telekinesis
Fresh Espresso
Phantogram
Past Lives
Boys Noize
Neon Indian
Hudson Mohawke

The comedy lineup included Rob Riggle, Bobcat Goldthwait, Luke Burbank, Mike Birbiglia, Patton Oswalt and Craig Robinson.

2009
The lineup for the 2009 Sasquatch! Music Festival was announced on February 17, 2009.  Headliners for the event included Jane's Addiction, Kings of Leon, and Ben Harper & Relentless7. The event took place on Memorial Day weekend, May 23–25, 2009.

Lineup

Saturday, May 23

Kings of Leon
Yeah Yeah Yeahs
The Decemberists
Animal Collective
Bon Iver
Devotchka
M. Ward
Doves
Sun Kil Moon
The Gaslight Anthem
King Khan and the Shrines
Ra Ra riot
Shearwater
Passion Pit
Mt. St. Helens Vietnam Band
Vince Mira
Blind Pilot
Owl City
Arthur & Yu
Dent May & His Magnificent Ukulele
Death Vessel
Hockey
Crystal Castles
Mos Def
Champagne Champagne

Sunday, May 24

Jane's Addiction
Nine Inch Nails
TV on the Radio
of Montreal
The Avett Brothers
M83
The Airborne Toxic Event
Calexico
The Walkmen
The Wrens
St. Vincent
John Vanderslice
The Submarines
Viva Voce
The Dodos
The Builders and the Butchers
A. A. Bondy
Fences
Point Juncture, WA
The Murder City Devils
Natalie Portman's Shaved Head
Deadmau5
Mike Watt and The Missingmen
The Henry Clay People
Street Sweeper Social Club
Mad Rad

Monday, May 25

Ben Harper & Relentless7
Chromeo (DJ set)
Erykah Badu
Silversun Pickups
Fleet Foxes
Gogol Bordello
Santigold
Grizzly Bear
Explosions in the Sky
Girl Talk
Blitzen Trapper
The Knux
Monotonix
Bishop Allen
Black Moth Super Rainbow
Beach House
Deerhoof
The Dutchess and the Duke
School of Seven Bells
Horse Feathers
The Pica Beats
Loch Lomond
Tobacco
BLK JKS
Heartless Bastards
Other Lives
Amanda Blank

The comedy lineup included Zach Galifianakis, Tim and Eric Awesome Show, Great Job!, Todd Barry, H. Jon Benjamin, God's Pottery, People's Republic of Komedy, The Whitest Kids U Know, The Red Wine Boys, and Maria Bamford.

2008
The lineup for the 2008 Sasquatch! Music Festival was announced on February 25, 2008.  Headliners for the event included R.E.M., The Cure, and The Flaming Lips. The event took place on Memorial Day weekend, May 24–26, 2008. Hosted by Rainn Wilson.

Lineup

Saturday, May 24

David Bazan
Beirut
The Breeders
Crudo (featuring Mike Patton & Dan the Automator)
Dead Confederate
Dengue Fever
Destroyer
Kathleen Edwards
Newton Faulkner
Fleet Foxes
Grand Archives
Grand Hallway
M.I.A.
Vince Mira with the Roy Kay Trio
Modest Mouse
Capibara
Okkervil River
Ozomatli
The National
The New Pornographers
R.E.M.
The Shaky Hands
Throw Me the Statue
The Whigs
Neko Case (played on the Wookie stage at the same time Fleet Foxes were on mainstage, and was an unannounced last minute addition to the lineup)

Sunday, May 25

65daysofstatic
"Awesome"
The Blakes
Blue Scholars
Cancer Rising
Sera Cahoone
Cold War Kids
The Cops
The Cure
Death Cab for Cutie
Michael Franti & Spearhead
The Heavenly States
The Kooks
Stephen Malkmus and the Jicks
The Maldives
Mates of State
The Morning Benders
The presidents of the United States of America
Rogue Wave
Tegan and Sara
J. Tillman
Truckasaurus
What Made Milwaukee Famous
White Rabbits

Monday, May 26

Battles
Built to Spill
The Cave Singers
The Choir Practice
Matt Costa
Delta Spirit
Dyme Def
The Flaming Lips U.F.O. Show
Flight of the Conchords
Ghostland Observatory
The Hives
Kay Kay and His Weathered Underground
Kinski
Jamie Lidell
The Little Ones
The Mars Volta
The Moondoggies
Pela
Rodrigo y Gabriela
Say Hi
Siberian
Thao with the Get Down Stay Down
Whalebones
Yeasayer

Comedy lineup
The 2008 festival features the first ever Sasquatch! comedy tent.

Saturday

Matt Besser
Sean Conroy
Rich Fulcher
Tim Meadows
Jerry Minor
Horatio Sanz
Upright Citizens Brigade
Matt Walsh

Sunday

Aziza Diaz
Andy Haynes
Kevin Hyder
Morgan Murphy
Andy Peters
Brian Posehn
Derek Sheen
Reggie Watts

Monday

Michael Ian Black
Liza Keckler
Marc Maron
Mike Min
Eugene Mirman
Korby Sears
Seattle School
Michael Showalter

Christmas on Mars
The Flaming Lips' long-awaited film Christmas on Mars premiered on Sunday, May 25 at the festival.

2007
The 2007 Sasquatch! Music Festival was hosted by Sarah Silverman, Michael Showalter, and Aziz Ansari.

Lineup

Saturday, May 26

Aqueduct
Arcade Fire
Björk
Blitzen Trapper
The Blow
Neko Case
Manu Chao Radio Bemba Sound System
Citizen Cope
Electrelane
Ghostland Observatory
Grizzly Bear
The Hold Steady
Loney, Dear
The Long Winters
Mirah
Mix Master Mike
Ozomatli
Saturday Knights
The Slip
Gabriel Teodros
Two Gallants
Visqueen
Viva Voce

Sunday, May 27

Bad Brains
Beastie Boys
The Black Angels
Blackalicious
The Blakes
Common Market
The Dandy Warhols
Earl Greyhound
Michael Franti & Spearhead
The Helio Sequence
Interpol
Minus the Bear
Mix Master Mike
Money Mark
The Polyphonic Spree
St. Vincent
Smoosh
Spoon
Stars of Track and Field
Jesse Sykes and the Sweet Hereafter
Tokyo Police Club
Total Experience Gospel Choir
Patrick Wolf

M.I.A. was scheduled to perform but cancelled due to visa complications.

2006
The 2006 Sasquatch! Music Festival marked the first time the festival ran for three days.  The event began on Friday, May 26 and lasted until Sunday, May 28.  The second day was marked by an afternoon hailstorm, which forced Neko Case and her band off stage and threatened to shut down the show entirely. Fortunately, the storm subsided and the festival was able to continue as scheduled.

Lineup

Friday, May 26

...And You Will Know Us by the Trail of Dead
Bauhaus
Deadboy and the Elephantmen
Nine Inch Nails
TV on the Radio
HIM
The Trucks
Wolfmother

Saturday, May 27

Architecture in Helsinki
Band of Horses
Bedouin Soundclash
Neko Case
Common Market
The Constantines
Matt Costa
Brett Dennen
The Flaming Lips
David Ford
Gomez
Ben Harper and the Innocent Criminals
Iron & Wine
Korby Lenker
Stephen Malkmus and the Jicks
Elvis Perkins
Sam Roberts Band
Rogue Wave
Tim Seely
The Shins
Slender Means
Sufjan Stevens
The Tragically Hip

Sunday, May 28

Arctic Monkeys
Beck
Big City Rock
Blue Scholars
Clap Your Hands Say Yeah
Death Cab for Cutie
The Decemberists
Headphones
Heavenly States
Damien Jurado
Ben Lee
Big Japan
Jamie Lidell
Matisyahu
Mercir
Nada Surf
Pretty Girls Make Graves
Queens of the Stone Age
Chad VanGaalen
Laura Veirs
Rocky Votolato
Village Green
We Are Scientists

2005
The 2005 Sasquatch! Music Festival took place on Saturday, May 28.

Lineup

Saturday, May 28

Arcade Fire
Aqueduct
The Be Good Tanyas
Benevento/Russo Duo
Bobby Bare Jr.
Bloc Party
Blue Scholars
Crystal Skulls
The Dears
The Frames
Jem
Ray LaMontagne
Math and Physics Club
Matisyahu
Menomena
Modest Mouse
A. C. Newman
Joanna Newsom
Parks & Recreation
Pixies
She Wants Revenge
Smoosh
United State of Electronica
Visqueen
Kanye West
Wilco

2004
The 2004 Sasquatch! Music Festival took place on Saturday, May 29. The event was hosted by David Cross.

Lineup

Saturday, May 29

Apollo Sunshine
Aveo
The Black Keys
Built to Spill
Cat Power
Harvey Danger
The Decemberists
Donavon Frankenreiter
Fruit Bats
Gary Jules
The Long Winters
The New Pornographers
The Postal Service
The Roots
The Shins
Sleater-Kinney
Thievery Corporation
Visqueen

2003
Hosted by El Vez.

Lineup

Saturday, May 24

Joseph Arthur
Calexico
Brandi Carlile
Neko Case
Circus Contraption
Coldplay
Death Cab for Cutie
Eisley
The Flaming Lips
Jurassic 5
Maktub
Minus the Bear
Modest Mouse
Jason Mraz
The Music
My Morning Jacket
The Pale Pacific
Pedro the Lion
Liz Phair
Reclinerland
Sam Roberts
Ron Sexsmith
The Thermals
Kathleen Edwards

2002

Lineup

Saturday, May 25

Blackalicious
Galactic
Ben Harper
Jack Johnson
Maktub
Soulive
The String Cheese Incident

Performers that have played more than once
Nine times
Neko Case – 2003, 2004 (with The New Pornographers), 2006, 2007, 2008 (solo and with the New Pornographers), 2010 (with the New Pornographers), 2014, 2018
Six times
Ben Gibbard – 2003, 2006, 2008, 2011 (with Death Cab for Cutie), 2004, 2013 (with The Postal Service)
Modest Mouse – 2003, 2005, 2008, 2011, 2015, 2018
Five Times
The Decemberists – 2004, 2006, 2009, 2011, 2015
Four Times
Death Cab for Cutie – 2003, 2006, 2008, 2011
The Flaming Lips – 2003, 2006, 2008, 2011
The Shins – 2004, 2006, 2012, 2017
The National – 2008, 2010, 2014, 2018
Tune-Yards – 2010, 2012, 2014, 2018
David Bazan – 2003, 2018 (with Pedro the Lion), 2006 (with Headphones), 2008
Phantogram – 2010, 2014, 2016 (with Big Grams), 2017
Blitzen Trapper – 2007, 2009, 2012, 2017
Three times
Ben Harper – 2002, 2006, 2009
Blind Pilot – 2009, 2012, 2016
Blue Scholars – 2005, 2006, 2008
Bon Iver – 2009, 2012, 2018
Built to Spill- 2004, 2008, 2013
Cold War Kids – 2008, 2011, 2014
Explosions in the Sky- 2009, 2012, 2018
Fleet Foxes- Twice in 2008, 2009
Grizzly Bear – 2007, 2009, 2018
The Long Winters – 2004, 2007, 2010
Macklemore & Ryan Lewis – 2011, 2012 (surprise show), 2013
Major Lazer – 2011, 2014, 2016
Minus the Bear – 2003, 2007, 2010
Sam Lachow – 2014, 2015, 2017
Sam Roberts – 2003, 2006, 2011
Shakey Graves – 2014, 2015, 2018
Spoon – 2007, 2015, 2018
St. Vincent – 2007, 2009, 2012
Stephen Malkmus – 2006, 2008 (with Stephen Malkmus and the Jicks), 2010 (with Pavement)
Thunderpussy – 2015, 2016, 2018
TV On The Radio – 2006, 2009, 2018
Visqueen – 2004, 2005, 2007
Two Times
Aqueduct – 2005, 2007
Arcade Fire – 2005, 2007
Beach House – 2009, 2011
Blackalicious – 2002, 2007
Common Market – 2006, 2007
Deadmau5 – 2009, 2010
Ghostland Observatory – 2007, 2008
Local Natives – 2010, 2011
Michael Franti & Spearhead – 2007, 2008
Maktub – 2002, 2003
Matisyahu – 2005, 2006
My Morning Jacket – 2003, 2010
Nada Surf – 2006, 2010
Nine Inch Nails – 2006, 2009
Passion Pit – 2009, 2010
Santigold – 2009, 2012
Shara Worden – 2009 (with The Decemberists and Bon Iver)
Smoosh – 2005, 2007
Tegan and Sara – 2008, 2010
Kim Deal – 2005 (with The Pixies), 2008 (with The Breeders)
Wilco – 2005, 2011
The Head and the Heart – 2011, 2012
Girl Talk – 2009, 2012
Mumford and Sons – 2010, 2013
The Postal Service – 2004, 2013
Foster the People – 2011, 2014
Kid Cudi – 2010, 2014
Tycho – 2012, 2014
Of Monsters and Men – 2012, 2015
The War on Drugs – 2012, 2015
Father John Misty – 2013, 2015
Odesza – 2013, 2015
M83 – 2009, 2016
Sufjan Stevens – 2006, 2016
Unknown Mortal Orchestra – 2012, 2016
Rudimental – 2014, 2016
Chet Faker – 2014, 2016
MGMT – 2010, 2017
Japandroids – 2010, 2018
Jack Antonoff – 2012 (with fun.), 2017 (with Bleachers)
Twenty One Pilots – 2015, 2017
Chance The Rapper – 2014, 2017
Sleigh Bells – 2011, 2017
The Radio Dept. – 2011, 2017
Katie Kate – 2012, 2017
Big Freedia – 2014, 2017
Kaytranada – 2015, 2017
Manatee Commune – 2015, 2017
Wolf Parade – 2011, 2018
Ray LaMontagne – 2005, 2018
Vince Staples – 2016, 2018
Tyler, The Creator – 2014, 2018

References

External links
 Official website

Press

 2003 festival review at Seattle PI
 2004 festival review at Left Off The Dial
 2009 festival review at Tiny Mix Tapes
 2010 festival review at Tiny Mix Tapes
 Interview with Sasquatch founder Adam Zacks at Synthesis

Rock festivals in the United States
Tourist attractions in Grant County, Washington
Music festivals established in 2002
Music festivals disestablished in 2018
Music festivals in Washington (state)
Defunct music festivals
2002 establishments in Washington (state)
2018 disestablishments in Washington (state)